Surf Diva is a surf company from La Jolla, California, United States. They serve surf clinics at La Jolla Shores and provide clothes and equipment for surfing.

Quoted "The Starbucks of surf schools" by Newsweek Magazine, Surf Diva Surf School is considered the pillar of women's surfing in the action sports industry and offers surfing and standup paddleboard (SUP) lessons year-round for women and men, girls and boys in La Jolla and Costa Rica. Surf Diva is actively involved in charities and outreach to support both the local community and to raise awareness to protect the surrounding environment. Surf Diva has been involved with the Surfrider Foundation, Coastkeeper,  Life Rolls On Foundation, Freedom is Not Free, Liquid Nation, and many more. The Surf Diva Boutique received "Best Beachwear" store in San Diego in 2007, 2008, 2009, and 2010 the A-List and is nominated as Women's Retailer of the Year 2010 by SIMA.

History
Surf Diva was founded in 1996 by twin sisters, Isabelle "Izzy" Tihanyi and Caroline "Coco" Tihanyi. They started the first women's surf school and currently have clinics in San Diego, Los Angeles, and started in Costa Rica in 2003.

External links
Surf Diva Official websites

References

 These twin divas caught the wave Los Angeles Times
 Surf Diva helps women, girls catch a wave Great Escape
 Move over Gidget, here comes 'Blue Crush'  USA TODAY

Surfwear brands
Clothing companies established in 1996